Dermot Keely (born 8 March 1954) is an Irish former manager and player. He was a schoolteacher by profession.

Family
Keely's family have played League of Ireland football at various levels. His late father Peter Keely played for Shelbourne., his brother Joe played on the same Home Farm FAI Cup winning side of 1975 as Dermot himself. His son Alan Keely, who died suddenly in May 2021, also played in the League of Ireland.

Career

Player
As a player Keely started with Home Farm and then signed for St. Patrick's Athletic under Barry Bridges who appointed him club captain. He played with Terry Venables while at Richmond Park (football ground). In June 1977 he was about to depart for Adelaide on a 2-year contract when the deal fell through.

He then moved to Dundalk where he made his debut against Shamrock Rovers in September 1978. In his first season the County Louth outfit won the domestic double. In 1981 Keely captained Dundalk to win the FAI Cup. The League Cup was also won this season.

Keely then signed for Glentoran in the Irish League where in his two seasons there he won the Irish Cup, a Gold Cup and an Ulster Cup.

Keely's time with Dundalk and Glentoran saw him play in notable European Cup ties. In 1979, Dundalk reached the second round of the 1979–80 European Cup and were drawn with Celtic. The first leg saw Dundalk produce a notable display to come away with a 3–2 defeat at Parkhead. In the return leg in front of a packed Oriel Park with Keely as captain, Dundalk missed a last-minute opportunity to win the tie on away goals and the game finished 0–0 . This is regarded as one of the best performances by a League of Ireland club in European competition.

Two years later, Keely played his part in Glentoran's run to the second round of the European Cup. In the first leg against CSKA Sofia, they lost 2–0. However, the return leg saw Glentoran take a 2–0 lead, forcing the game into extra time. With only five minutes remaining, CSKA scored the goal they needed. The tie finished 3–2 on aggregate, which had been the closest Glentoran came to reaching the last eight of European competition since 1974.

Player-manager
Keely's first managerial job was as UCD player-manager. However, after just two months at Belfield Jim McLaughlin (football manager) persuaded Keely to sign for Shamrock Rovers. He made his debut against Athlone Town in November 1983. He scored his first goal for Rovers in a 3–2 defeat to Shelbourne at Harold's Cross on 11 December 1983. When McLaughlin left at the end of the 1985/86 season to manage his home club Derry City Dermot was appointed player-manager on 16 May.

In the 1986/87 season, Rovers owners controversially announced the sale of Glenmalure Park near the end of season. However, Rovers won another double in this their final season at Milltown to bring Keely's Rovers haul to 4 League championships and 3 FAI Cups.

The 1987/88 season started with Rovers controversially playing at Tolka Park. Rovers fans boycotted the ground en masse. Every game was picketed and with the crowds practically gone the team invariably suffered. Keely was quoted years later as saying:   

He resigned after the last game of the season on 8 April 1988. During his time at Rovers he won one Inter-League cap and represented the club 6 times in European competition.

In May 1988 Keely signed for Bray Wanderers However, he never played for the Seasiders and by November Keely was player/assistant manager to Ray Treacy at Home Farm F.C.

Manager
He then took over as manager of Sligo Rovers in 1989 and achieved promotion in his first season. He guided Sligo Rovers to their highest Premier Division place in a decade in the 1990/91 season by finishing 5th.

After a brief spell at Longford Town he took over at Dundalk where he won the League Championship in 1995. He then guided Finn Harps to promotion to the Premier Division in 1996. After managing Athlone Town he took over the reins at Home Farm Everton where he won the League of Ireland First Division Shield in 1998.

In the calendar year 1996 Keely managed four clubs: Dundalk, Finn Harps, Athlone Town and Home Farm.
    
He took over as manager of Shelbourne in July 1998  and won two championships (1999–2000 and 2001–02) and one FAI Cup (2000) in his time at Tolka Park. He also guided Shels to victory over Macedonian side Sloga Jugomagnat in the first round of the 2000–01 UEFA Champions League qualifiers. Shels 1–0 win in the first leg in Skopje was the first away win for a League of Ireland side in any UEFA competitions for eighteen years.

Keely then became the first manager of new league club Kildare County in 2002. After a credible 5th-place finish he then walked out to manage Derry City lasting only 3 months

After a spell out of the game he then took over at Dublin City. He then took over the management position at Shelbourne FC in 2007 and in his first season back finished fifth in the first division. In his second season in charge, Shelbourne lead the division going into the final game, and needed a home win against mid-table Limerick to gain promotion, but were denied by a 92nd-minute equaliser, and so were overhauled by Dundalk, who won away to Kildare County. On 27 May 2010, Keely stepped down as manager of Shelbourne to become Shelbourne's youth team manager and community development officer.

Keely has also been working as a Maths and English teacher in De La Salle College Churchtown for over 20 years until he retired at Christmas 2011 he also has a weekly column in the Irish Sun.

Honours

As a player
 League of Ireland: 5
 Dundalk 1978/79, 
 Shamrock Rovers 1983/84, 1984/85, 1985/86, 1986/87
  FAI Cup: 5
 Home Farm 1975
 Dundalk 1979, 1981
 Shamrock Rovers 1985, 1986
 League of Ireland Cup
 Dundalk 1980/81
 Irish Cup
 Glentoran 1983
Gold Cup 
 Glentoran 1982/83
Ulster Cup 
 Glentoran 1982/83
 PFAI Player of the Year:
 Shamrock Rovers – 1983/84
 SWAI Personality of the Year
 Shamrock Rovers – 1984/85
Player of the Year:
 Shamrock Rovers – 1984/85

As a manager
 League of Ireland Premier Division: 4
 Shamrock Rovers F.C. 1986–87  
 Dundalk F.C. 1994–95
 Shelbourne F.C. 1999–2000 , 2001–02 
 FAI Cup: 2
 Shamrock Rovers F.C. 1987
 Shelbourne F.C. 2000
 League of Ireland First Division Shield 
 Home Farm Everton 1998
 SWAI Personality of the Year
 Shelbourne F.C. – 2000

References

Sources
 The Hoops by Paul Doolan and Robert Goggins

1954 births
Living people
Association footballers from County Dublin
Republic of Ireland association footballers
Association football defenders
League of Ireland managers
Republic of Ireland football managers
League of Ireland players
Home Farm F.C. players
Home Farm F.C. coaches
St Patrick's Athletic F.C. players
Dundalk F.C. players
Dundalk F.C. managers
Glentoran F.C. players
University College Dublin A.F.C. managers
Athlone Town A.F.C. managers
Shelbourne F.C. managers
Shamrock Rovers F.C. players
Shamrock Rovers F.C. managers
Sligo Rovers F.C. managers
Longford Town F.C. managers
NIFL Premiership players
Derry City F.C. managers
League of Ireland XI players
Kildare County F.C. managers
Irish schoolteachers